Dmytro Valeriyovych Lelyuk is a retired Soviet and Ukrainian football player.

Career
Dmytro Lelyuk, started his career in 1994 at Nyva Vinnytsia until 1998, where he played 26 games. In 1996 played also 3 matches with Nyva-2 Vinnytsia. In 1997 he moved to Polissya Zhytomyr where he played 20 matches and scored 1 goal. In 1998 he returned to Nyva Vinnytsia until 2002 where he played 104 and scored 2 goals. In 2002 he moved Desna Chernihiv the main club of the city of Chernihiv, where he played 12 matches and scored 1 goal and in the same season he played 9 matches for Elektrometalurh-NZF Nikopol and also for Olkom Melitopol. In 2004 he moved to Russia in the football club Lokomotiv Chita where he played 29 matches.

Honours
Nyva Vinnytsia
 Ukrainian Cup: Runner-Up 1996

References

External links 
 Dmytro Lelyuk allplayers.in.ua
 

1974 births
Living people
People from Vuhlehirsk
Ukrainian footballers
FC Desna Chernihiv players
FC Nyva Vinnytsia players
FC Nyva Bershad players
FC Polissya Zhytomyr players
FC Kryvbas Kryvyi Rih players
FC Elektrometalurh-NZF Nikopol players
SC Olkom Melitopol players
FC Chita players
Ukrainian Premier League players
Ukrainian First League players
Ukrainian Second League players
Ukrainian expatriate footballers
Expatriate footballers in Russia
Ukrainian expatriate sportspeople in Russia
Association football defenders
Sportspeople from Donetsk Oblast